True Haviland Oliver (25 January 1881 – 21 October 1957) was a Canadian sports shooter. He competed in the team clay pigeon event at the 1920 Summer Olympics.

References

External links
 

1881 births
1957 deaths
Canadian male sport shooters
Olympic shooters of Canada
Shooters at the 1920 Summer Olympics
People from Albert County, New Brunswick
Sportspeople from New Brunswick
20th-century Canadian people